Forest High School or The Forest High School may refer to:

Forest High School (Florida), Ocala, Florida, United States
Forest High School (Louisiana), Forest, Louisiana, United States
Forest High School (Mississippi), Forest, Mississippi, United States
The Forest High School, Cinderford, Gloucestershire, England
The Forest High School (New South Wales), Sydney, New South Wales, Australia

See also
Forest School (disambiguation)
Carolina Forest High School, South Carolina